The American Osteopathic Board of Surgery (AOBS) is an organization that provides board certification to qualified Doctors of Osteopathic Medicine (D.O.) who specialize in the use of surgery to aid in the diagnosis and treatment of disease (surgeons). The board is one 18 medical specialty certifying boards of the American Osteopathic Association Bureau of Osteopathic Specialists approved by the American Osteopathic Association (AOA). As of 2011, 1,279 osteopathic physicians held active certification with the AOBS. The AOBS is one of two certifying boards for surgeons in the United States; the other certifying board is the American Board of Surgery of the American Board of Medical Specialties. Fellows of the AOBS are eligible for full membership in major U.S. surgical societies such as the American College of Surgeons (ACS) and the Society of Thoracic Surgeons. Board certified surgeons of the AOBS are also eligible for membership in the American Society for Metabolic & Bariatric Surgery.

Board certification
Initial certification is available to osteopathic physicians who have successfully completed an AOA-approved surgical residency, and successfully completed the required written and oral exams.  

Recertification became mandatory in 1997. Before this time, the initial board certification was permanent and recertification was not required. Since 1997, diplomates the American Osteopathic Board of Surgery requires osteopathic surgeons to renew their certification every ten years to avoid expiration of their board certified status.

Osteopathic surgeons may also receive primary board certification in the following areas: 
 General Surgery 
 Neurological Surgery 
 Plastic & Reconstructive Surgery 
 Thoracic Cardiovascular Surgery 
 Urological Surgery 
 General Vascular Surgery 

Osteopathic surgeons may also receive Certification of Added Qualifications in surgical critical care. The Certification of Added Qualifications must be maintained through the process of recertification every 10 years. 

In order for an osteopathic physician to be board-certified in any specialty, they must be AOA members, pay certification fees, and complete at least 120 hours of continuing medical education in a three-year period.

See also
 AOA Bureau of Osteopathic Specialists
 American Board of Surgery

References

External links
 AOBS homepage
 American Osteopathic Association

Osteopathic medical associations in the United States
Organizations established in 1940
Surgical organizations based in the United States
Medical and health organizations based in Ohio